Haim Arlosoroff (February 23, 1899 – June 16, 1933; also known as Chaim Arlozorov) was a Socialist Zionist leader of the Yishuv during the British Mandate for Palestine, prior to the establishment of Israel, and head of the Political Department of the Jewish Agency. In 1933, Arlosoroff was assassinated while walking on the beach in Tel Aviv.

Biography
Haim Arlosoroff was born into a Jewish family in Romny, Ukraine (then part of the Russian Empire), on February 23, 1899. In Russia, he was known as Vitaly, the Russian equivalent of Haim. When living in Germany, he was known as Viktor. Arlosoroff's paternal grandfather was Rabbi Eliezer Arlosoroff of Romny, an author of religious commentaries on the Talmud. At the age of six, Arlosoroff encountered antisemitism for the first time. In 1905, the Arlosoroff family home in Romny was attacked during a violent pogrom. The family fled across the German border to East Prussia. Seven years later, the family settled in Königsberg, Germany (now the Russian city of Kaliningrad). Arlosoroff thus became fluent in German, in addition to studying Hebrew with a tutor. When World War I began in 1914, the family did not have German citizenship and were threatened with deportation. The family eventually obtained permission to move to Berlin. When his father, Saul, returned to Russia on business, he was barred from returning and died there of cholera. Arlosoroff studied economics at the University of Berlin and obtained a doctorate in that subject. During his studies, he wrote articles on Zionist affairs. In Germany, he became a key leader of Hapoel Hatzair (also Ha-Po'el ha-Tza'ir, Hebrew for "The Young Worker"), a socialist political party which attracted many of the intellectuals of the time. As a result of his party affiliation, Arlosoroff was appointed editor of "Die Arbeit" (German for "The Labour"), a journal in which his writings were first published.

Though Arlosoroff was not observant, both his precociousness and his strong feelings as a Jew can be seen in a letter he wrote at age 17 to his German literature teacher: "I am a Jew, and I feel strong and proud of my Jewishness. I feel it in my bones that I am different from a German, and it would never occur to me to deny this…. My soul yearns for the unique, ancient Hebrew culture. But I also like German culture, and perhaps I am also afraid to admit how great my love for it is…Yet, Goethe and Schiller never really touched my heart closely." In 1919, Arlosoroff published the treatise "Jewish People's Socialism", his first major written contribution relating to a nationalistic hope for the Jewish people in Eretz Israel. In his treatise, Arlosoroff distanced himself from traditional Marxist beliefs by advocating a new brand of socialism that embraced a national consciousness. Arlosoroff's contention was that the Jewish people would only be able to preserve and revive their unique cultural identities within a Jewish national homeland. Arlosoroff further professed, that through the establishment of "Jewish People's Socialism", Jews would be guaranteed public land ownership upon their return to Eretz Israel. In accord with the visions of other socialist Zionists of his time, Arlosoroff believed that ancient Biblical agricultural traditions, such as the "Sabbath Year" and "Year of Jubilee", could be restored in modern practice alongside institutional parameters established for the new Jewish nation. Arlosoroff's treatise accurately predicted a powerful resurgence of the Hebrew language would accompany the return of Jewish people to Eretz Israel.

Arlosoroff first visited Palestine in the spring of 1921. Shortly after his arrival, the Jaffa riots broke out. In the midst of Arab rioting, Arlosoroff stood in defense of Neve Shalom, a Jewish settlement adjacent to Tel Aviv and Jaffa. These events helped draw Arlosoroff's focus to the need for better relations between Jews and Arabs. Following the riots, Arlosoroff called upon the Zionist establishment to no longer deny the reality of an Arab national movement existing in Eretz Israel. However, Arlosoroff's plea was not widely accepted, and he received criticism from within the ranks of his own party, Hapoel Hatzair. Arlosoroff would ultimately come to the position that strength-based compromise with neighboring Arabs would not weaken or undermine efforts to establish a Jewish national homeland.

In the 1923 Zionist Congress, Arlosoroff was elected to the Zionist Action Committee. He was only 24 years old at the time. Turning down a university position, he left Germany for the British Mandate of Palestine in 1924. In 1926 he was chosen to represent the yishuv at the League of Nations in Geneva.

Arlosoroff's hope for peaceful cooperation and compromise with Arabs would be severely tested. In 1929, the consciously aggressive Betar Youth Movement, organized under Ze'ev Jabotinsky's Union of Revisionist Zionists, took part in a coalition to assertively enforce and enlarge a Jewish presence in the proximity of the Western Wall. The activities of Betar and their associates inflamed an explosive reaction from the Arab community, in whose perception these activities had dishonoured the Muslim holy site on the adjacent Temple Mount. The violent Western Wall Uprisings of 1929 ensued, which resulted in the loss of many lives, including civilians. Instead of inciting further Arab tensions, Arlosoroff strongly criticized the Revisionists for insensitively provoking the animosity.

Political career
In 1930, Arlosoroff was influential in unifying the two major Zionist socialist political parties, the Poale Zion and the Hapoel Hatzair. This merger brought the establishment of the Mapai Labour Party. Through the Mapai's political muscle, Arlosoroff received election as a member of the Zionist Executive at the 1931 Zionist Congress. In addition, he was named Political Director of the Jewish Agency for Palestine, a prominent position he filled until his 1933 assassination.

As the Jewish Agency's Political Director, Arlosoroff first believed that the British would help settling Jews in Palestine, so he worked with the British mandatory government which was in charge of running that territory. Prior to his tenure as Political Director, Arlosoroff had already familiarized himself with the British system of rule, having written an essay titled "The British Administration and the Jewish National Home". During his years in office, Arlosoroff would develop close working relationships with Britain's High Commissioner Arthur Wauchope and British Colonial Secretary Sir Philip Cunliffe-Lister.

Arlosoroff was a close friend of the Jewish scientist and statesman, Chaim Weizmann. Dr. Weizmann was considered to be among the most politically moderate of Arlosoroff's Mapai Zionist contemporaries.

In the months leading up to his assassination, Arlosoroff's fervor to help establish a Jewish national homeland intensified. At a Mapai Labour Council meeting occurring in January 1933, Arlosoroff strongly clashed with David Ben-Gurion and other prominent Mapai leaders regarding whether or not the Zionists should work within the British government's infrastructure to help bring about Jewish statehood. Arlosoroff warned his colleagues that if the Zionist movement maintained an isolationist policy with the British ruling authorities, Arab political influence would increase within the British Administration and cause the rights of Jewish people in Eretz Israel to suffer.

On April 8, 1933, Arlosoroff organized a historic event at the King David Hotel in Jerusalem on the Jewish Agency's behalf. The luncheon, attended by Weizmann and prominent Arab leaders of Transjordan, would be the first time Jewish Zionists and key Arabs gathered together to help promote cooperative efforts between the two groups. Arlosoroff hoped that by building an accord with the Arab sheiks of Transjordan, political relations with Arab leaders of Mandatory Palestine might be enhanced. However, not everyone was pleased with Arlosoroff's vision for Jewish/Arab collaboration, nor the possibility of a bi-nationalistic future in Eretz Israel. After the luncheon, Arab radicals openly chastised the moderate Arabs who had attended the meeting. Certain Arab leaders in Mandatory Palestine distanced themselves completely from the Transjordanian Arab delegation. Particular anger was directed at Transjordan's Emir Abdullah, the ruler over large territories in Transjordan, who had taken a leading role in the conciliation efforts. Jewish opposition to the King David Hotel meeting also became apparent as the major party of religious Zionism, Mizrachi, demanded that Arlosoroff should resign from his position at the Jewish Agency. Some radicals in the Revisionist movement went even further and questioned Arlosoroff's right to be alive.

As a result of Adolf Hitler's rise to power in Germany, Arlosoroff directed his focus to the plight of German Jews. The Germany Arlosoroff loved growing up changed quickly and drastically upon Hitler's rise to power. In April 1933, the new regime implemented the first of many anti-Jewish laws by terminating all Jewish employees from German government positions. Also at that time, Nazi officials decreed Jewish people would not be permitted to leave the country without a specially issued exit visa. Jewish groups responded worldwide to Hitler's regime through protests and boycotts of German products.
Immediately following an organized Nazi boycott of Jewish businesses in Germany on April 1, 1933, Arlosoroff contacted High Commissioner Arthur Wauchope requesting Britain's intervention in the crisis. Arlosoroff asked Wauchope to consider that supplementary immigration visas for Mandatory Palestine be granted to Jewish people seeking refuge from Hitler's Reich.

Though Hitler hated Jewish people and wanted them expelled from Germany, in 1933 the Nazis were not willing to let a large number of Jewish refugees flee to the surrounding nations. This was because Reich officials were concerned that fleeing Jewish refugees would lend large numbers to a growing international movement for the economic boycott of Nazi Germany. Adding to Hitler's worries, German financial advisers warned the Nazi government that a mass exodus of Jewish laborers from the German workforce would badly damage Germany's economic stability. The Nazis needed a convenient solution to rid themselves of Jews without a political or economic backlash.

In 1933, Arlosoroff and German Reich officials viewed the British Mandate of Palestine as a land of opportunity for very different reasons. In the eyes of the Nazi leadership, the remote British-controlled territory appeared to be a "dumping-ground" suitable to isolate thousands of anti-Hitler Jewish refugees from the world's political arena. In addition, a financial agreement with Zionist leaders for the transfer of the refugees would help bolster a German economy adversely affected by anti-Nazi boycotts. For Arlosoroff and other Zionists, however, the potential mass transfer of Germany's Jews along with their assets to Eretz Israel presented a historic opportunity to help guarantee the future establishment of a Jewish nation in Mandatory Palestine.

Arlosoroff came to feel that the British could not be trusted and that the Jews must risk angering them in order to rebuild their own homeland and save the Jews of Europe from the nationalist and authoritarian regimes under which they lived, especially in Nazi Germany.

In his efforts to help Jews escape the tyranny of Hitler, Arlosoroff would face staunch opposition from the Revisionist ranks within his own Zionist movement. Though Mapai Labour leaders attempted to prepare the way for an agreement with Germany by mitigating anti-Nazi sentiment within Zionist circles, prominent Revisionist leader Ze'ev Jabotinsky steadfastly opposed them. In a radio broadcast on April 28, 1933, Jabotinsky strongly condemned any possible pact between Zionism and Hitler. Jabotinsky upheld in his radio address the Revisionist platform for an international economic boycott on German exports, suggesting in addition that the British Mandate of Palestine should assume the lead in the boycott efforts.

Ha'avara agreement

At this point, Haim Arlosoroff visited Nazi Germany to negotiate the controversial Ha'avara Agreement. It allowed for the emigration of Jews to Palestine along with most of their property. The Germans were happy to get rid of Jews but unwilling to allow them to take their property with them. Via the agreement, the Jews had to put their money into a special bank account. This money was then used to purchase German goods for export to Palestine (and other countries). The proceeds of the sale of these goods were given to the Jews on their arrival in Palestine. For the Nazis, this helped them get rid of Jews but overcame any attempts at a boycott of German exports (especially from a moral point of view since it was the Jews themselves importing the goods). For the Zionist settlement, the influx of capital gave a much-needed economic boom in the midst of worldwide depression.

Approximately a year after Arlosoroff and German officials formalized the Ha'avara Agreement, a substantial economic reaction began to take place in Eretz Israel. As a result, many new Jewish immigrants came to dwell in the Holy Land. Prior to the Ha'avara Agreement, only several thousand Jewish workers had been immigrating to the British Mandate of Palestine on a yearly basis. After the agreement was signed, however, over 50,000 new Jewish workers made the British Mandate of Palestine their home within two years. The Ha'avara Agreement's initial impact on Jewish immigration would be widespread, as an approximate 20% of the first 50,000 new Jewish immigrants in Eretz Israel came from Germany. By 1936, just three years after the Ha'avara Agreement became effective, the population of Jewish people within the British Mandate of Palestine had doubled in size.

Over a period of time, some of Hitler's elite Nazi entourage, including Adolf Eichmann, began to deeply regret Germany's participation in the Ha'avara Agreement.

Ultimately, over 60,000 German Jews escaped persecution by the Nazis directly or indirectly through the Ha'avara Agreement. In addition, the Ha'avara Agreement transferred an approximate $100 million to the British Mandate of Palestine, which helped establish an industrial infrastructure for the soon to be Jewish nation. Ha'avara Agreement funds were also used for the purchase of land and the development of many new Jewish settlements that now help define the current boundaries of Israel.

Assassination

On 16 June 1933, just two days after his return from negotiations in Germany, Haim Arlosoroff was murdered. He was killed while walking with his wife, Sima, on a beach in Tel Aviv. Arlosoroff's funeral was the largest in the history of Mandatory Palestine, with an estimated assemblage of 70,000 to 100,000 mourners. The death of Arlosoroff greatly aggravated political relations within the Zionist movement.

Abba Ahimeir, the head of an activist group with fascist tendencies, the Brit HaBirionim, was charged by the Palestine Police Force with plotting the assassination. Ahimeir was also a leader of the nationalist Zionist Revisionist faction whose publication, "Hazit HaAm" continuously attacked the Labor movement and Zionist leaders, including Arlosoroff, calling him names and stating that the Jewish people "will know how to react to such villains". Two rank-and-file Revisionists, Abraham Stavsky and Ze'evi Rosenblatt, were arrested as the actual murderers and were identified by Arlosoroff's widow. All three vehemently denied the accusation.

The district court acquitted Ahimeir and Rosenblatt but convicted Stavsky, who, however, was eventually acquitted by the Supreme Court for lack of corroborating evidence, as the law then required. The defense accused the police of manipulating the widow's testimony and other evidence for political reasons, and expounded the theory that the murder was connected to an intended sexual attack on Sima Arlosoroff by two young Arabs. Stavsky later rose within Irgun ranks and was responsible for the procurement of the Irgun arms vessel known as the "Altalena." He was killed in the attack on the ship by the newly established Israel Defense Forces on the Beach of Tel Aviv.

In addition to theories that people connected to the revisionist movement were the perpetrators of the murder, or that it was an intended sexual attack by two Arabs, there are theories connecting it to the Soviet and Nazi regimes. The Soviet theory was promoted by Shmuel Dothan in 1991 to counter what the Russians considered as a global military plot against them. The Nazi theory involves Joseph Goebbels, who supposedly sent two agents, Theo Korth and Heinz Geronda, to kill Arlosoroff. During her school days, Magda Ritschel, who later became Joseph Goebbels' wife, met and became close friends with Lisa Arlosoroff, Haim's sister. 
Magda met Haim at university; they became lovers, and she became involved with him in Zionist affairs. According to Lisa's diary, Magda fervently participated in the debates of the group "Tikwath Zion" on the future of Palestine and learned Hebrew. She wore a necklace with the Star of David that he gave her as a love token, and they even planned to emigrate to Palestine together. 

However, the relationship ended with Haim's departure, as Magda did not follow. In 1921, Magda married Günther Quandt, a rich German industrialist twice her age. In 1929, Günther discovered that Magda was having an affair, so he separated from her. He went on to divorce Magda that same year but was generous with the divorce settlement. Magda was having the affair with her old Jewish boyfriend Viktor (Haim) Arlosoroff, a 30-year-old law student.

In 1931, she began to date Joseph Goebbels. After he began going out with Magda, he learned of her Jewish stepfather, Richard Friedländer. For days at a time, she did not visit him. After a while, she stopped answering the phone or keeping dates. Eventually, Joseph found out he had a rival: Haim Arlosoroff, who was equally enraged to learn Magda was two-timing him with the Nazi gauleiter of Berlin. Haim was so enraged, in fact, that during one meeting with Magda, he pulled out a revolver, and, in a jealous, dramatic scene, fired at her, deliberately missing. The bullet buried itself in the wall near Magda, and she permanently broke off her relationship with Haim, despite his pleas and apologies. Magda wed Joseph on 19 December 1931, with Adolf Hitler as his best man. When Haim visited Berlin in 1933, he discovered his old flame arm-in-arm with Joseph. He even came across an opposition newspaper with the headline "Nazi Chief weds Jewess". 

Once the shock had subsided, Haim, so the theory went, began to view Magda as his conduit to Joseph to secure the Ha'avarah agreement. Their old relationship proved to be an embarrassment to the Goebbels, who were, at that point, very much part of the Nazi leadership. Joseph allegedly took notice of his wife's former Jewish boyfriend, which is why he was "terminated". Magda's former Jewish stepfather was later arrested on Joseph's orders on 15 June 1938 and sent to Buchenwald, where he died on 18 February 1939.

For years, right-wing figures claimed to have been wrongfully accused by Mapai of responsibility for Arlosoroff's assassination. Some 50 years after the murder, following the publication of a book on the assassination by Shabtai Teveth in 1982, the Israeli government, now led by Menachem Begin, established a formal investigative committee. As the first Israeli Prime Minister elected from the Revisionist movement, Begin had taken offense at a suggestion in Teveth's book that a Revisionist acquitted in court for Arlosoroff's murder may have actually been responsible after all. 

The Judicial Commission of Enquiry was led by the former High court of Justice Judge David Bachor. Its purpose was to decide whether Rosenblatt and Stavsky were responsible for assassinating Arlosoroff, or not. The committee decided unanimously that Rosenblatt and Stavsky had nothing to do with the murder. The committee was inconclusive about the identity of the real murderers, or whether or not the murder was politically motivated.

Legacy and commemoration

Arlosoroff is buried at the Trumpeldor Cemetery in Tel Aviv. Arlosoroff's memory is honored today by the many streets named after him throughout the towns of Israel and in the names of several places in Israel: Safed, Kiryat Haim, a large neighborhood of Haifa, Giv'at Haim, a kibutz and Kfar Haim, a moshav.

An 8-foot tall bronze monument dedicated to the legacy of Dr. Chaim Arlosoroff has been erected at the Tel Aviv shoreline promenade where he was fatally wounded.

The name of Haim Arlosoroff was also used for a ship carrying Jewish refugees to Palestine, the former USCGC Unalga (WPG-53). On 27 February 1947, the Haim Arlosoroff (1,378 passengers from Sweden and Italy) was intercepted by Royal Navy destroyer HMS Chieftain, and the passengers put up fierce resistance. The ship ran aground at Bat Galim south of Haifa, just opposite a British Army camp. The crew and passengers were arrested and deported to Cyprus.

See also
List of unsolved deaths

References

Bibliography

External links
 The personal papers of Haim Arlosoroff are kept at the Central Zionist Archives in Jerusalem

1899 births
Assassinated Jews
1933 deaths
Burials at Trumpeldor Cemetery
Heads of the Jewish Agency for Israel
Jewish National Council members
Jewish socialists
Male murder victims
Mapai politicians
Members of the Assembly of Representatives (Mandatory Palestine)
People from Romny
Ukrainian Jews